Le Prese railway station is a railway station in the village of Le Prese, within the municipality of Poschiavo and canton of Graubünden in Switzerland. It is located on the Bernina line of the Rhaetian Railway.

The station is located in the road, and comprises a single track within the carriageway, with a single kerbside platform and a roadside station building. To the north of the station, the line continues to share the street with road traffic as it passes through the village of Le Prese, before reaching the passing loop of Spinadascio. To the south, as far as Miralago, the line runs between the road and Lago di Poschiavo.

The station opened on 1 July 1908 with the opening of the Tirano to Poschiavo section of the Bernina line. Originally train services halted directly in front of the entrance to the hotel, and until 1975 the station had a passing loop.

Services
The following services stop at Le Prese:

 Regio: hourly service between St. Moritz and Tirano.

References

External links
 
 

Railway stations in Graubünden
Rhaetian Railway stations
Poschiavo
20th-century architecture in Switzerland
Railway stations in Switzerland opened in 1908